The Free Fringe is an organisation that promotes free shows at the Edinburgh Festival Fringe.

Free Fringe may also refer to:

 The concept of promoting free shows at the Edinburgh Festival Fringe  
 All promoters of free shows at the Edinburgh Festival Fringe collectively. These are:
 Free Fringe (also known as PBH's Free Fringe)
 Laughing Horse Free Festival
 Heroes of the Fringe